Tila is a genus of moth in the family Gelechiidae.

Species
Tila capsophilella (Chrétien, 1900)
Tila sequanda (Povolny, 1974)

References

Gnorimoschemini